Pickens County Jail is a historic jail building in Jasper, Georgia. It was added to the National Register of Historic Places on January 12, 1984. It is located on North Main Street.

It was designed by Atlanta architect James W. Golucke.  Jail cells were provided by Pauly Jail Company of St. Louis, Missouri.

It is a two-story, brick and marble building.  Its marble facade, marble porch columns, and turrets are done in a rusticated style.  It was deemed notable as a county jail building somewhat unusual for its incorporation of local marble into its construction.

See also
National Register of Historic Places listings in Pickens County, Georgia

References

External links

Jails on the National Register of Historic Places in Georgia (U.S. state)
Buildings and structures in Pickens County, Georgia